This is a list of notable Cambodian people, persons from Cambodia or of Khmer descent.
 Adda Angel
 Am Rong
 Ampor Tevi
 Arn Chorn-Pond
 Beat Richner
 Bérénice Marlohe
 Bour Kry
 Chan Nak
 Chan Sy
 Chanthou Oeur
 Chan Vathanaka
 Chath Piersath
 Chea Sim
 Chea Soth
 Chea Vichea
 Cheam Channy
 Cheng Heng
 Chhet Sovanpanha
 Chhim Sothy
 Chhouk Rin
 Chou Bun Eng
 Chuon Nath
 Danh Monica
 Dien Del
 Dith Pran
 Duong Saree
 Dy Saveth
 Eh Phuthong
 Geraldine Cox
 Haing S. Ngor
 Heng Samrin
 Him Sivorn
 Hong Lim
 Hun Sen
 Hun Many
 Hun Manet
 Ieng Sary
 Ieng Thirith
 Ieu Koeus
 Ieu Pannakar
 In Tam
 In Vichet
 Jayavarman VII
 Jessa Khan
 Kak Channthy
 Kem Monovithya
 Kem Sokha
 Kem Ley
 Keng Vannsak
 Keo Pich Pisey
 Keo Sokpheng
 Khieu Ponnary
 Khieu Samphan
 Khieu Thavika
 Kong Som Eun
 Koul Panha
 Liev Tuk
 L'Okhna Suttantaprija ind
 Lon Nil
 Lon Nol
 Lon Non
 Long Boret
 Loung Ung
 Maha Ghosananda
 Mam Nai
 Meas Samon
 Meas Sophea
 Meng Keo Pichenda
 Neak Oknha
 Norodom Buppha Devi
 Norodom Ranariddh
 Norodom Sihamoni
 Norodom Sihanouk
 Norodom Suramarit
 Nuon Chea
 Pan Ron
 Pen Ran
 Peter L. Pond
 Pisith Pilika
 Pol Pot
 Preah Botumthera Som
 Preap Sovath
 Rim Kin
 Rithy Panh
 Ros Serey Sothea
 Ros Sopheap
 Sam Rainsy
 Sam Sary
 Saom Vansodany
 Sar Kheng
 Sinn Sisamouth
 Gen. Sak Sutsakhan
 Sok Sreymom
 Somaly Mam
 Sorn Seavmey
 Son Ngoc Minh
 Son Ngoc Thanh
 Son Sann
 Son Sen
 Sosthène Fernandez
 Soth Polin
 Ta Mok
 Teng Bunma
 Tep Rindaro
 Tep Vong
 Thierry Bin
 Thongvan Fanmuong
 Ung Huot
 Vann Vannak
 Vandy Kaonn
 Vann Molyvann
 Vann Nath
 Veth Rattana
 Vichara Dany
 Virak Dara
 Yim Guechse
 Yoeun Mek
 Yol Aularong
 You Bo

See also
 Lists of people by nationality